

References

External links
 List of national team oars

Blades – National team oars